Truck-kun is an Internet meme that refers to a common trope used in the isekai genre of anime and manga, in which characters are transported to other worlds. Typically, the protagonists of the isekai anime or manga are sent to these worlds via reincarnation after death. Though recently, many isekai works have featured characters being transported upon being hit and killed by a truck. After several isekai works featured this as a means to kill their characters, a meme claiming the existence of a character named "Truck-kun" spread. It is purported Truck-kun's role is to kill people in their original world and subsequently send them to a new one.

Origins of the meme
Early examples of discussion of the trope include a Reddit thread entitled "Trucks in Manga – RE: Marina" by user poloport from April 14, 2015. In the post, a page from the manga RE: Marina shows the central character Rinosuke being hit by a truck. The character is not killed, but the incident brings the main characters in the story together. This post resulted in further posts in which people pointed out examples of trucks running into the protagonists of manga, with isekai manga featuring heavily.

In 2017, an anime fan compiled a list of causes of death among isekai protagonists, which was updated in 2018. Deaths caused by "Traffic accident by truck" came third in the study with 37 cases, with general traffic accidents coming second with 38 cases, and unknown causes first with 102 cases.

Later developments
Critics have since recorded the appearance of "Truck-kun" in multiple series. These include Didn't I Say to Make My Abilities Average in the Next Life?!, Mushoku Tensei, The Eminence in Shadow, Zombie Land Saga and Wise Man's Grandchild. There are also alternative versions of the plot device, such as in KonoSuba, where lead character Kazuma Satō dies from shock after rescuing someone from being run over by what he thinks is a truck, but is later discovered to be a slow-moving tractor that posed no danger to the person he was attempting to save.

Response to the meme
Since the creation of the meme, people have retrospectively examined earlier series to see other uses of motor accidents in anime and manga. Examples include Osamu Tezuka's sci-fi manga Astro Boy, in which Tobio Tenma is killed in a car accident at the beginning of the story, resulting in his father creating the robot Astro Boy in his image; as well as the anime series Magical Princess Minky Momo, in which Momo loses her powers and is killed by a truck late in the series before being reincarnated as a baby.

Notes

References

External links

Anime and manga terminology
Fictional vehicles
Film and television memes
Internet memes introduced in 2015
Isekai
Fiction about reincarnation
Trucks